Noureddin Zarrinkelk (born 9 April 1937, in Mashhad), also spelled Zarrin-Kelk, also known as Noori or Nouri, is an Iranian animator, concept artist, editor, graphic designer, illustrator, layout artist, photographer, script writer, educator, and sculptor.

Biography 
He studied pharmacy at Tehran University and holds a PharmD. Then he studied animation film in the Belgium Royal Academy Of Fine Arts (Raoul Servais) from 1969 till 1972. 
 
Zarrinkelk founded the first school of Animation, which later merged with the prestigious faculty of fine art of Tehran University. Zarrinkelk continued being a professor of animation and graphic arts well into his retirement age.

Since 1971, Zarrinkelk has been Jury member of various international animation festivals and illustration biennials.

Zarrinkelk was elected as the president of ASIFA (Association International du Film d'Animation) by his peers in 2003.

Zarrinkelk is known as the father of animation of Iran.

Influence
The art of animation as practised in modern day Iran started in 1950s. Iran's animation owes largely to Noureddin Zarrinkelk. Zarrinkelk was instrumental in founding the Institute for Intellectual Development of Children and Young Adults (IIDCYA) in Tehran in collaboration with the late father of Iranian graphics Morteza Momayez and other fellow artists like Farshid Mesghali, Ali Akbar Sadeghi and Arapik Baghdasarian, among others.

Education
Puppet Film; “Jiri Trnka” Studios; Prag 1975
Animation Film; “Royal Academy Of Fine Arts” Belgium 1969-1972
Miniature (Persian Traditional Painting) School; Tehran 1950’s
PhD Pharmacy; Tehran University 1955-1962

Films
In the U.N.; Writer, Designer & Director (Under Production)
Pood; Writer, Designer & Director 2000
Identity (For UNICEF); Writer, Designer & Director 1999
Moscow; (Mouse & Cow) Writer, Designer & Director 1998
Sinbad; (Full length animated feature) Stylist, Director 1987-1991 (Hollywood)
Super Powers; Writer, Designer & Director 1982
A Way To Neighbor; Writer, Designer & Director 1978
Prince Amir-Hamzeh; Writer, Designer & Director 1977
The Mad, Mad, Mad World; Writer, Designer & Director 1975
Atal-Matal; Writer, Designer & Director 1974
Association Of Ideas; Writer, Designer & Director 1973
Philipo and a Train from Hong Kong; Director 1971 (Belgium)
A Playground for Baboush; Writer, Designer & Director 1971 (Belgium)
Duty, First; Designer & Director 1970 (Belgium)

Publications
Rumi’s Stories, Illustrations (under Publication)
Prince Arsalan, Illustrations 2005
Mullah Nasruddin, Illustrations 2005
The Elephant and the Ant, Text & illustration 2005
In the U.N.; Text & Illustration 2005
From the waters; Text & Illustration 1996
Multi-Job Factory; Text & Illustration 1988
A-B-Zoo; Text & Illustration 1986
Medical Publications (700 Title); Design & Illustration 1984-1985
If I were God; Text & Illustration 1983
When I was a Kid; Text (Illustrations by Zarrinkelk Junior) 1981
Story of the Silk Worm; Text & Illustrations 1979
Cyrus the King; Illustrations 1977
Albino and the Princess; Illustrations 1976
Folk Tales From Asia; Issue 1-3 Illustrations 1975
New Year’s Day and the Kites; Illustrations 1974
Story of the Carpet Flowers; Illustrations 1973
Albini and the Sphinx; Illustrations 1972
The Crows; Illustrations 1968
Hero “Amir-Hamzeh”; Illustrations 1967
The Myth of the Sphinx; Illustrations 1965
Iran, Crossroad of Caravans; Illustrations 1964
Text Book For Schools (Grade 1 to 4); Illustrations 1960-1970
Various Newspapers; Graphics, Illustrations, Caricatures 1950-1960

Other activities
President of ASIFA international Association of Animated Film since November 2003
Member of the board of directors of ASIFA* International, 1988–2000
Founder and President of ASIFA* Iran since 1986
Founder and Teacher of Animation, Post Graduate School, “Farabi” Art University, Tehran 1977-1996
Founder and Teacher of the first Animation School, Tehran 1974-1977
Member of ASIFA International since 1971
Jury Member of various international animation festival and illustration Biennales since 1975

Awards
 Permanent resident, Association International du Film d’Animation.
 Hans Christian Andersen Life Achievement for children books
 Jewell of the Century, Annecy International Film Festival, France 2000, for “The Mad, Mad, Mad World”
 Collection Tokyo Museum of Illustration, Japan 2000, for “Mullah Nasruddin”
 Jury’s special award Tehran International Biennial, Iran 1999, for “Mullah Nasruddin”
 Jury’s special award Tehran International Film Festival, Iran 1989, for “Supper Powers”
 Special Mention, Bologna Book Exhibition, Italy 1987, for “A-B-Zoo”
 Diploma Of Honor, Hans Christian Andersen Jury For Lifetime Achievement 1984
 Diploma of Honor, Giffoni International Film Festival, Italy for “Prince Hamzeh” 1978
 Diploma Of Honor, Paris International Short Film Festival for “the Mad, Mad, Mad World” 1977
 First Prize for Subject, Oberhausen International Film Festival 1977, for “the Mad, Mad, Mad World” 1977
 Plate of Honour, “Cairo International Film Festival” Egypt for “the Mad, Mad, Mad World” 1977
 Silver Prize, Espinho International Film Festival, Portugal, for “the Mad, Mad, Mad World” 1977
 Diploma of Honor, Chicago International Film Festival 1976
 First Prize for Subject, Saloniki Film Festival, Greece, for “the Mad, Mad, Mad World” 1977
 Diploma of Honor, San Francisco International Film Festival, for Association of Ideas 1975
Best Book of the year, “IBBY Iran”, for “When I was a kid” 1975
 Prix Clothide Coupie, Belgium National Film Festival 1973, for “Duty, First”
 Prize for Schools, Annecy International Film Festival, France, 1969, for “Duty, First”
Golden Apple, Biennial of Illustration Bratislava, Slovakia 1971, for “The Crows”
Best Book of the year, “UNESCO International”, Tokyo, Japan 1970, for “The Crows”
Best Book of the year, “UNESCO Iran”, for “The Crows” 1970
Plate of Honor, IBBY Iran, for “Myth of the Sphinx” 1969

Notes

See also
Iranian modern art
History of Iranian animation
Famous names in animation
History of animation

External links
 Official website (archive)

1937 births
Animation educators
International Animated Film Association
Iranian animated film directors
Iranian animators
Living people
People from Mashhad
University of Tehran alumni
Academic staff of the University of Tehran